Gabriella Monique "Kika" Toulouse (born May 3, 1989) is an American soccer player.

Early life
Raised in Arlington, Virginia, Toulouse attended Bishop Denis J. O'Connell High School where she helped the team to three Washington Catholic Athletic Conference championship titles. She also played club soccer for Braddock Road Club (BRYC) and won six Virginia State Cup Championships with two different teams within the club.

University of Virginia Cavaliers
Toulouse attended the University of Virginia where she played for the Cavaliers from 2007 to 2011.

Club career

Rågsveds IF
In 2012, Toulouse played for Rågsveds IF in the Swedish Football Division 4. She scored nine goals during her 2012 campaign including two hat-tricks, one of which occurred during her first professional game.

Washington Spirit
In February 2013, Toulouse signed with the Washington Spirit for the inaugural season of the National Women's Soccer League.

Houston Dash
On January 10, 2014, it was announced that the Houston Dash had selected Toulouse with the tenth and final pick in the 2014 NWSL Expansion Draft.
She was waived by the Houston Dash in September 2014. She has since retired and currently works with the New York Red Bulls.

International career
Toulouse has represented the United States as a member of the United States women's national under-23 soccer team.

References

External links
 US Soccer player profile
 

1989 births
Living people
Washington Spirit players
American women's soccer players
Soccer players from Virginia
Sportspeople from Arlington County, Virginia
Virginia Cavaliers women's soccer players
University of Virginia alumni
Houston Dash players
Women's association football defenders
National Women's Soccer League players
Orange County Waves players